ARI may refer to:

Organizations
Acoustics Research Institute of the Austrian Academy of Sciences
Civic Coalition ARI, a political party in Argentina
American Refrigerant Institute, North America
Angel Resource Institute
Arthur Rylah Institute for Environmental Research, Victoria, Australia
Associazione Radioamatori Italiani, Italian amateur radio association
Astronomisches Rechen-Institut, an institute based in Heidelberg, Germany
Astrophysics Research Institute, Merseyside, England
Autism Research Institute
Avicenna Research Institute, an Iranian biotechnology institute
Ayn Rand Institute, promoting Objectivism

Other uses
Chacalluta International Airport in Arica, Chile (IATA code)
Aberdeen Royal Infirmary, Scotland
Acute respiratory infection
Adjusted Rand Index, a clustering metric
 A common abbreviation for the U.S. state of Arizona and its major professional sports teams
 Arizona Cardinals of the National Football League
 Arizona Diamondbacks of Major League Baseball
 Arizona Coyotes of the National Hockey League
Autofahrer-Rundfunk-Informationssystem, former German radio traffic broadcasts
Automated Readability Index

See also
Ari (disambiguation)